Yokena Presbyterian Church is a Presbyterian church building near Vicksburg, Mississippi. It was built in 1885 and added to the National Register of Historic Places in 1984.

References

Presbyterian churches in Mississippi
Churches on the National Register of Historic Places in Mississippi
Queen Anne architecture in Mississippi
Churches completed in 1885
Buildings and structures in Vicksburg, Mississippi
National Register of Historic Places in Warren County, Mississippi